Anita M. Caspary, IHM (November 4, 1915 in Herrick, South Dakota – October 5, 2011 in Los Angeles, California) was an American former religious sister and later the president of an ecumenical Christian community. Under her leadership as Mother General, over 300 sisters relinquished their canonical status as Sisters of the Immaculate Heart of Mary and formed the new Immaculate Heart Community of California.

Caspary and her former IHM sisters organized the new Immaculate Heart Community as an independent religious entity. They are a religious community without any official church affiliation. The majority remained lay Catholics. In addition to her leadership role with the Immaculate Heart Community, Caspary was president of Immaculate Heart College (1958–63), English professor, popular teacher and lecturer, published author and poet.

Acknowledged as a transformative leader in the post Vatican II Catholic Church, she was featured on the cover of Time magazine, February 23, 1970.

Biography
An excellent teacher, advisor, and mentor, Anita quickly was selected for graduate studies. She received a master’s degree in English from the University of Southern California (1942) and a doctorate in English from Stanford University (1948). Graduate studies introduced new worlds to Anita. Learning the art of reasoned argument, experiencing a diversity of opinions, prepared her well for the life of a college professor. One student wrote, “her observations were of great value as I plotted my life's path, and her insight into where I might fit in life was right on the mark, as it turned out.” Returning from Stanford she rose quickly in the ranks of academic leadership to chair of the English department (1950) and graduate dean of the college. She envisioned a scholarly life in English literature and Catholic intellectual life in the IHM community.

In 1957, Anita was appointed president of Immaculate Heart College. Known for excellence in the liberal arts, IHC was considered the progressive Catholic college in the west. Under her leadership and with a young and energetic faculty, IHC gained a national reputation for creativity and innovative methods. She attended the Presidents’ Professional Association Management Course for Presidents and received a certificate of participation in 1964. In 1966 she received a certificate of completion from the American Management Association’s Executive Action Course. In both management training programs, she was a rare women participant

In 1963 Anita was elected Mother General of the Immaculate Heart Sisters, and led the community in the renewal process of Vatican II. In her award-winning book Witness to Integrity: The Crisis of the Immaculate Heart Community of California she described the struggle, conflict and choice of the IHM women to form a new community. Of that period of her life, she wrote, "In many ways, we foreshadowed the contemporary (and vibrant) feminist movement within the Catholic Church." Anita had the unique distinction of being a Mother General of a congregation of Catholic sisters and a president of an ecumenical community. For this, she was featured on the cover of TIME magazine, February 23, 1970.

In the seventies, she was a sought after scholar and lecturer. She attended Harvard University’s Divinity School in the early 1970s as the first woman who received the Merrill Fellowship. From 1973-1975, she participated in Notre Dame University’s theology program. Following these positions she taught at the Graduate Theological Union in Berkeley, CA. She was also a visiting professor in the School of Religion at the University of Southern California in Los Angeles, CA.

In the 1980s, she was the first director of the Peace and Justice Center of Southern CA and started the annual Wholistic Retreat for Women which continues today. In the nineties she taught courses in the Feminist Spirituality Program of Immaculate Heart College Center. At the age of 85 she was awarded a grant to teach poetry to the IHM members at the Kenmore residence and learned to use the computer. At age 95, she had completed a volume of her poetry and was anticipating publication.

	"Caspary’s life extended through eight papacies and dramatic developments within the Catholic Church, including its shift from a Euro-centric to a global entity and new roles for laity and women. Recognized as one of the most influential Catholic sisters of her era and a principal participant in the debates that shaped the role of women religious in the U.S. Church, Caspary’s life and the IHM struggle of the Immaculate Heart Sisters of California with the male hierarchy forms a critical juncture in the history of the renewal of religious life for women in the Catholic Church during the 20th century."

Memoir
Caspary taught high school English while studying toward a master's degree at the University of Southern California. She received her Ph.D. in 1948 from Stanford University. She wrote a 2003 memoir, Witness to Integrity. In 2012, a collection of her poems, FROM THE HEART: Poems by Anita M. Caspary, I.H.M., was published posthumously.

Death
Caspary died on October 5, 2011 in Los Angeles, California.

Notes
a. Immaculate Heart College of Los Angeles, CA closed in 1980.

References
1. Maloney, Susan. M. “Obedience, Responsibility and Freedom: Anita M. Caspary, IHM and the Post-Conciliar Renewal of Catholic Women Religious” U.S. Catholic Historian. Fall, 2014: 32 (4):122.

2. Ibid. 143. "In 1969, fifty IHM sisters did not accept Caspary’s invitation to start a new community. By 1976 this group of fifty women split into three smaller communities. One group became the Sisters of the Immaculate Heart of Mary, Los Angeles and hold pontifical status. These members reside in Southern California. They do not accept new candidates. The second group, Sisters of Mary, Mother of the Church have two members who live in Ojai, California and hold diocesan status with the Los Angeles Archdiocese. They do not accept new members. The Sisters of the Immaculate Heart of Mary, Wichita, Kansas are the third group. They are a diocesan congregation and accept new members."

3. Ibid. 122. From 1967-2003 over 200 newspaper, journal and magazine articles report about Caspary’s role and the conflict between the IHMs and Church authorities

Sources
www.anitacaspary.com

Maloney, Susan M. (2005) "The Choices Before Us: Anita Caspary and the Immaculate Heart Community." In Umansky, Lauri; Avital (eds.). Impossible to Hold: Women and Culture in the 1960s. New York: New York University Press. pp. 177–195. ISBN 978-0-81479-909-3.

James Patrick Shannon, Reluctant Dissenter (New York: The Crossroad Publishing Co., 1998), 130.
Mark S. Massa, SJ, “The Dangers of History” in The American Catholic Revolution: How the Sixties Changed the Church Forever (New York: Oxford University Press, 2010), 75–102;
Mark S. Massa, SJ “To Be Beautiful, Human, and Christian—The IHM Nuns and the Routinization of Charisma,” in Catholics and American Culture (New York: Crossroad Publishing Co., 1999), 172–194.
Nan Deane Cano, IHM. Take Heart: Growing as a Faith Community - The Immaculate Heart Community of California (New York: Paulist Press, 2016) 
Lora Ann Quinonez, CDP, and Mary Daniel Turner, SNDdeN, The Transformation of American Catholic Sisters (Philadelphia: Temple University Press, 1992), 42.
Marshall Mercer, “‘You People Don’t Pray Right’: A Study of Organizational Power and Superordinate Goal Conflict” (Ph.D. dissertation, Claremont Graduate School, 1994),
Marcelle Bernstein, The Nuns (New York: J.B. Lippincott, 1976), 149–154.
Three documentary films detail the conflict: “Nuns in Conflict” (Man Alive series, British Broadcasting Corporation, 1968), “Lamp Unto My Feet” CBS TV, 1970)and "Rebel Hearts" (Rebel Hearts FIlm, 2021) .

1915 births
2011 deaths
20th-century American nuns
Schoolteachers from California
People from Gregory County, South Dakota
Stanford University alumni
University of Southern California alumni
20th-century American women writers
Writers from South Dakota
Writers from Los Angeles
Catholics from South Dakota
Catholics from California
20th-century American educators
20th-century American women educators
21st-century American nuns